John Hardin Oldham (born November 6, 1932) is a former Major League Baseball player. Although he was a pitcher during all of his professional career, Oldham's only MLB appearance came as a pinch runner for the Cincinnati Redlegs in the 1956 season; he is one of only two pitchers (the other being Larry Yount) who appeared in a major league game without throwing a single pitch.

College
Oldham was a three-year letterwinner at San Jose State University, from 1952 through 1954. A member of the school's Hall of Fame, Oldham still holds the Spartans' career and single-season records for strikeouts and walks; he also ranks among the school's top ten for career wins, and career and single-season innings pitched. He was the first Humboldt Crabs player to play in the Major Leagues.

Professional
He spent that season with the minor league Columbia Reds of the South Atlantic League. In , he pitched for the Seattle Rainiers of the Pacific Coast League, where he had a record of 9–6 and an earned run average of 3.84.

Despite not appearing in a single minor league game in 1956 (due to an injury), the Redlegs called Oldham up in September. On September 2, 1956, he entered the game against the Chicago Cubs in the third inning at Crosley Field in Cincinnati as a pinch runner for Ted Kluszewski, who himself had pinch-hit for third baseman Alex Grammas. The next batter popped out and Oldham was replaced on defense by Rocky Bridges. Although he pitched for three more seasons in the minors, his MLB career was over.

Oldham batted right and threw left-handed, which was itself unusual: as of 2015, only 553 players in MLB history (about 3% of all players) hit right and threw left, with Hall of Famer Rickey Henderson probably the best known.

Coaching
From 1970 to 1984, Oldham coached baseball at San Jose City College. From 1985 to 1997, Oldham coached the Broncos of Santa Clara University, leading them to four NCAA appearances and three West Coast Conference championships. His final record at Santa Clara was 433–324–6, a .571 winning percentage.

References

External links

1932 births
Living people
Asheville Tourists players
Baseball coaches from California
Baseball players from California
Cincinnati Redlegs players
Columbia Reds players
Columbus/Gastonia Pirates players
Nashville Vols players
San Jose State Spartans baseball players
Santa Clara Broncos baseball coaches
Savannah Redlegs players
Seattle Rainiers players
Sportspeople from Salinas, California
Yakima Braves players